Butchers Creek is a rural locality in the Tablelands Region, Queensland, Australia.

Geography 
Butchers Creek is on the eastern edge of the Atherton Tableland. It is one of the few parts of the tableland that drains eastward, its creeks being tributaries of the Mulgrave River. The area receives high rainfall and the traditional land use has been for dairying and beef fattening.

History 
Butchers Creek is said to take its name from a massacre of the Ngajanji people at a bora ring in the area in the 1880s.

In the early 20th century, a group of Russian emigrants established dairy farms in the area, giving it the nickname "Little Siberia".

Butchers Creek Provisional School opened on 8 October 1913 with 11 students studying under teacher John Tait. It became Butchers Creek State School in 1918. The school celebrated its centenary in 2013.

Education 
Butchers Creek State School is a government primary (Prep-6) school for boys and girls at Cnr Topaz & Gadaloff Roads. 

In 2016 the school had an enrolment of 27 students with 2 teachers and 4 non-teaching staff (2 full-time equivalent). 

In 2018  the school had an enrolment of 11 students with 2 teachers (1 full-time equivalent) and 4 non-teaching staff (2 full-time equivalent). It includes a special education program.

Notable residents 
Alexander Prokhorov, winner of the Nobel Prize for Physics in 1964, was born in Butchers Creek (then part of Peeramon) and attended Butchers Creek State School.

References 

Tablelands Region
Localities in Queensland